In 1963, Shaheen Fawz emerged as a national children organization. It played an active role specially in the then East Pakistan for a decade. It had branches all over the East Pakistan and in Lahore and Karachi. The founding president of this organization was Nur Mohammad Akon, a former deputy secretary of the People's Republic of Bangladesh. Those who were prominent among the members of central committee are, Barrister Qurban Ali, Shah Abdul Hannan (former Secretary of the People's Republic of Bangladesh), Muhammad Motiur Rahman, A.K.M. Muslem Uddin, Dr. Habibullah, Muhsin Uddin.

The organizational structure of Shaheen Fawz 
The central committee used to be consisting of Guardians and respected personalities. One of the central committee members used to be the president. The founding president of Shaheen Fawz was Mr. Nur Mohammad Akon. He was the president from 1963 to 1967. After him it was Mr. Mohammad Motiur Rahman (later became professor and the head of Bangla of the Asian University) who became the president. Mr. Motiur Rahman was the president from 1963–1971.
Anyone under 16 could have been the member of the organization with the permission of his guardian. There were several branches of Shaheen Fawz consisting of the members of it. There was a director for each branch. From its creation the central director of Shaheen Fawz was Mr. Kazi Shamsul Huq. He used to be the editor of a section of a weekly magazine, namely ‘Weekly Jahane Nao”. The name of that section was “ meeting of Shaheen”. He became popular for his editorial role as Shaheen vai [brother Shaheen]. There used to be a column in that section on the activities of Shaheen Fawz across the country. Mr. Kazi Shamsul Huq remained the central director till 1970. After him Mr. Masud Ali became the director and was in that role till the end of 1971. Mr. Kazi Shamsul Huq is now settled in New York and working as an editor of a Bengali Magazin namely Ekhon Shomoy. 
Those who were prominent among the active members of Shaheen Fawz are, Shah Abdul Halim (prominent columnist and political analyst), the president of Yoga Foundation Mr. Shahid Al-Bukhari, the Chairman of Mawshumi Industries Mr. Kazi Mahtab Uddin Ahmed, the News Editor of the Daily Inqilab Mr. Mohammad Musa and Dr. Shamsuddawla.
No activities of Shaheen Fawz are noticed after 1971.

References

External links
আলোর তিমিরে weekly SonarBangla, 20 April 2012
একজন গুনী লেখক অধ‍্যাপক মুহাম্মদ মতিউর রহমান 17 Dec 2010

Child-related organisations in Pakistan
Youth organizations established in 1963
Youth organisations based in Pakistan